Robert Hazard is the first EP (or mini-LP as it states on the sleeve) released by American musician Robert Hazard in June 1982 originally on his own record label "RHA Records" as Robert Hazard and the Heroes. After catching the attention of the music industry, Hazard signed for RCA Records who then remixed the album and released it nationally in late November 1982, along with removing the Heroes from the band name. There were two singles from the release, "Escalator of Life" and "Change Reaction", both of which charted in the US in 1983. The album also charted on the Billboard 200, peaking at #102.

Track listing

Personnel 
Robert Hazard – lead vocals, guitar
 Michael Pilla – vocals, guitar
 John Lilley – guitar
 Jerry Weindel – keyboards
 Rob Miller – bass
 Ken Bernard – drums

Technical
 Arthur Stoppe – engineer
 Ed Weisberg – art direction
 Robert Hakalski – photography
 Recorded at Sigma Sound Studios, Philadelphia
 Tracks 1, 2 and 4 mixed by Neil Kernon at Electric Lady Studios, New York
 Mastered by Howie Weinberg at Masterdisk, New York

Charts

References

External links
Music video for "Escalator of Life"
Music video for "Change Reaction"

1982 debut EPs
RCA Records EPs